Burhanpur is a village near Kotma tehsil (municipality). It is situated in block Kotma which is in Anuppur district, Madhya Pradesh, India. It had a population of 2079 according to the 2011 census.

References

Villages in Anuppur district